Kentucky Route 159 (KY 159) is a  state highway in Pendleton County, Kentucky. It runs from KY 22 just east of Falmouth to KY 9 (AA Highway) northwest of Foster.

Major intersections

References

0159
Kentucky Route 159